Steve Cohen (born April 28, 1946) is an American former gymnast. He competed in eight events at the 1968 Summer Olympics.

At the 1965 Maccabiah Games in Israel, he won four gold medals, four silver medals, and two bronze medals.

References

External links
 

1946 births
Living people
American male artistic gymnasts
Olympic gymnasts of the United States
Gymnasts at the 1968 Summer Olympics
Gymnasts from Philadelphia
Jewish American sportspeople
Jewish gymnasts
Competitors at the 1965 Maccabiah Games
Maccabiah Games medalists in gymnastics
Maccabiah Games gold medalists for the United States
Maccabiah Games silver medalists for the United States
Maccabiah Games bronze medalists for the United States
Penn State Nittany Lions men's gymnasts